"We Will Become Silhouettes" is a single by American indie band the Postal Service, released February 8, 2005, under the Sub Pop Records label. The single included a new track "Be Still My Heart" and two remixed tracks by Matthew Dear ("We Will Become Silhouettes") and Styrofoam ("Nothing Better").  The title track has been used in a Honda Civic commercial. Indie band The Shins recorded an acoustic cover of the title track, which was included as a B-side on The Postal Service's "Such Great Heights".

"We Will Become Silhouettes" was the fourth single released by The Postal Service and is the band's most successful, reaching number three on the Canadian Singles Chart, number 82 on the US Billboard Hot 100 and number 92 on the UK Singles Chart.

The cover artwork was designed by Kozyndan, who have illustrated the previous singles as well.

Music video
The video for this song, directed by Jared Hess, consists of incongruously lighthearted footage of a family (consisting of band members Ben Gibbard, Jimmy Tamborello, frequent collaborator Jenny Lewis, and two young children) playing and singing the song, then riding bicycles into the desert and, at the very end, watching the sun set in the distance. Their odd clothing, the worn down houses they pass by, abandoned streets, and the lyrics may suggest the video takes place far in the future, post-nuclear attack.

Track listing

Charts

Covers
The song was covered by Jenny and Tyler in 2013 as a part of their For Freedom EP.

In popular culture
The song was used in the trailer for the 2009 film Funny People, and also appeared in the movie Love Happens the same year.

The Shins' cover of the song was featured in the 2011 film The Art of Getting By.

References

External links
 AbsolutePunk (75%) link
 Pitchfork Media (4.3/10), link

2003 songs
2005 singles
The Postal Service songs
Songs about nuclear war and weapons
Sub Pop singles
Songs written by Ben Gibbard
Songs written by Dntel